Michèle Rivasi (born 9 February 1953 in Montélimar, Drôme) is a French politician who has been serving as a Member of the European Parliament (MEP) since 2009, for Europe Écologie–The Greens.

Education and early career
An alumna of the École normale supérieure de lettres et sciences humaines (Eng: Normal Superior school of Letters and Human Sciences), Rivasi worked as a biology teacher.

Political career

Career in national politics
In 1986 Rivasi founded the Commission for Independent Research and Information on Radioactivity following the Chernobyl disaster.

From 1997 until 2002, Rivasi was a member of the National Assembly, representing the Drôme's 1st constituency (Valence). In parliament, she served on the Defence Committee. She was classified as an independent ecologist close to the PS, but has since joined Europe Écologie–The Greens.

From September 2003 to November 2004, Rivasi was the director of Greenpeace in France.

Member of the European Parliament, 2009–present
In 2009, The Greens selected Rivasi to lead the Europe Écologie list in the South-East constituency ahead of the 2009 European elections, in addition to which she is an assistant to the Mayor of Valence, and a member of the General Council of the Drôme.

In parliament, Rivasi has served on the Committee on Industry, Research and Energy (2009-2014), the Committee on the Environment, Public Health and Food Safety (2014-2019) and the Special Committee on the European Union's authorisation procedure for pesticides (2018). Since the 2019 elections, she has been serving on the Committee on Development and the Committee on Budgetary Control. From 2010 until 2011, she notably served as the Parliament's rapporteur on measures to co-ordinate the European response to health crises such as the 2009 flu pandemic. In 2020, she also joined the Special Committee on Beating Cancer. Since 2021, she has been part of the Parliament's delegation to the Conference on the Future of Europe.

Following the 2019 elections, Rivasi was part of a cross-party working group in charge of drafting the European Parliament's four-year work program on digitization.

In addition to her committee assignments, Rivasi has also been part of the Parliament's delegation to the ACP–EU Joint Parliamentary Assembly since 2009. She is also a member of the European Parliament Intergroup on the Welfare and Conservation of Animals 

Ahead of the 2017 French presidential election, Rivasi ran for her party's nomination for the presidency but eventually lost in the final round of the primaries against Yannick Jadot.

In February 2019, Rivasi was one of four Green MEPs (the others being Molly Scott Cato, Tilly Metz, and Thomas Waitz) who were temporarily arrested after breaking into the Kleine Brogel Air Base to protest against the presence of U.S. B61 nuclear bombs on European soil; the protest followed the U.S. withdrawal from the Intermediate-range Nuclear Forces (INF) Treaty earlier that month.

Political positions
Rivasi describes herself as “vaccination skeptic”. She sparked controversy in July 2021 after comparing the extension of the health pass obligation announced by President Macron with apartheid and many left-wing officials, including from the Green, expressed their indignation and criticised her. On two occasions in 2021 she made a communication to the so-called ″conseil scientifique indépendant″ (Independent scientific council) of the highly controversial RéinfoCovid website that propagates COVID-19 vaccine misinformation. 

She is a strong supporter of alternative medicine and homeopathy. She opposes the planned Midi-Catalonia (Midcat) pipeline that would more than double the amount of gas that can be piped across the Pyrenees mountains that border Spain and France.

References

External links
 Michèle Rivasi homepage

1953 births
Living people
People from Montélimar
French people of Italian descent
Politicians from Auvergne-Rhône-Alpes
Europe Ecology – The Greens politicians
Deputies of the 11th National Assembly of the French Fifth Republic
Europe Ecology – The Greens MEPs
MEPs for South-East France 2009–2014
MEPs for South-East France 2014–2019
MEPs for France 2019–2024
21st-century women MEPs for France
People associated with Greenpeace
French anti–nuclear power activists
Anti-GMO activists
20th-century French women politicians
Women members of the National Assembly (France)
ENS Fontenay-Saint-Cloud-Lyon alumni
French conspiracy theorists
French anti-vaccination activists